Church of the Resurrection or Holy Resurrection Church may refer to:
 
 Church of the Holy Sepulchre, Jerusalem, built on the site believed to be the location of the burial and resurrection of Jesus Christ

Albania
 Holy Resurrection Church, Mborje, cultural Monument in Korçë County
 Resurrection Cathedral, Korçë, an Albanian Orthodox Church
 Resurrection Cathedral, Tirana, an Albanian Orthodox Church

Japan
 Holy Resurrection Cathedral, also known as Nikorai-do, an Orthodox church in Chiyoda ward, Tokyo

Kazakhstan
 Church of the Resurrection, Kokshetau, a Russian Orthodox cathedral in Akmola Region, Kazakhstan

Latvia
 Church of the Resurrection, Riga, a Lutheran Church

Lithuania
 Holy Resurrection Orthodox Church, Kaunas, an Eastern Orthodox church
 Christ's Resurrection Church, Kaunas, a Roman Catholic church

Macedonia
 Church of Resurrection of Christ, Kumanovo, an Orthodox church in North Macedonia that started construction in 2014

Montenegro
 Cathedral of the Resurrection of Christ, Podgorica, a Serbian Orthodox Church cathedral

Morocco
 Russian Orthodox Church in Rabat

Pakistan
 Cathedral Church of the Resurrection, Lahore, an Anglican cathedral

Poland
 Church of the Resurrection, Katowice, an Evangelical–Augsburg church

Romania
Church of the Resurrection, Sebeș, a Romanian Orthodox church.
Church of the Resurrection an Anglican Church in Bucharest.

Russia
 Church of the Savior on Blood, St. Petersburg, a former Russian Orthodox church, currently a museum
 Church of the Resurrection, Kadashi, a Russian Orthodox church in Moscow
 Church of the Resurrection, Kostroma, a Russian Orthodox church

Ukraine
 Church of the Resurrection, Chernihiv Chernihiv
 Church of the Resurrection, Foros, a Ukrainian Orthodox church
 Cathedral of the Resurrection of Christ, Kyiv, Kiev, a Ukrainian Greek Catholic Church

United Kingdom
 Church of the Resurrection and All Saints, Caldy, an Anglican church in Wirral, Merseyside
 Church of the Resurrection, Hurley, also called simply The Resurrection, an Anglican church in Warwickshire, England

United States
 Holy Resurrection Church (Belkofski, Alaska), a Russian Orthodox church
 Holy Resurrection Church (Kodiak, Alaska), a Russian Orthodox church
 Episcopal Church of the Resurrection (Pleasant Hill, California)
 Resurrection of the Lord Catholic Church (Waipahu, Hawaii), a Roman Catholic Church on the island of Oahu
 Resurrection Catholic Church, in Dubuque, Iowa
 United Methodist Church of the Resurrection, Leawood, Kansas
 Holy Resurrection Orthodox Church (Berlin, New Hampshire), an Eastern Orthodox Church
 Church of the Resurrection (Wheaton, Illinois), a former Episcopal church now serving as the cathedral of the Anglican Diocese of the Upper Midwest
 Church of the Resurrection (Manhattan), an Episcopal church on 74th Street in Manhattan, New York City
 Chapel of the Resurrection (New York City), a Roman Catholic chapel on 151st Street in Manhattan, New York City
 Church of the Resurrection (Queens), an Episcopal church on 118th Street in Richmond Hill/Kew Gardens, Queens, New York City
 Church of the Resurrection (Rye, New York), a Roman Catholic Church
 Church of the Resurrection (Little Switzerland, North Carolina), an Episcopal church
 Church of the Resurrection (Washington, D.C.), an Anglican church

Uruguay
 Russian Orthodox Church of the Resurrection, Montevideo

See also 
 Cathedral of the Resurrection (disambiguation)
 Christ's Resurrection Church (disambiguation)